The 1947 Middle Tennessee Blue Raiders football team represented the Middle Tennessee State College—now known as Middle Tennessee State University—as a member of the Volunteer State Athletic Conference (VSAC) during the 1947 college football season. Led by first-year head coach Charles M. Murphy, the Blue Raiders compiled a record an overall record of 9–1 with a mark of 5–0 in conference play, winning the VSAC title. The team's captains were Henry Brandon and Leonard Staggs.

Schedule

References

Middle Tennessee
Middle Tennessee Blue Raiders football seasons
Middle Tennessee Blue Raiders football